The 2011 AFC Asian Cup Final was a football match that took place on 29 January 2011 at the Khalifa International Stadium in Doha, Qatar, to determine the winner of the 2011 AFC Asian Cup. The match was won by Japan, defeating Australia 1–0 after extra time through a goal scored by Tadanari Lee. Japan thus qualified for the 2013 FIFA Confederations Cup as the representative from AFC.

The tournament's closing ceremony was held immediately before kickoff. 37,174 people attended the match, although several thousand supporters with tickets were prohibited from entering the stadium after entry was closed 30 minutes before the match commenced.

A television viewing audience of 484 million in 80 countries across the Asia-Pacific region, Europe, North America and North Africa witnessed Japan defeat Australia 1–0 in the final.

Background
The final was played between Japan and Australia. Japan, coached by Italian Alberto Zaccheroni, qualified for the final after defeating tournament host Qatar in the quarter-final and South Korea after a penalty shoot-out in the semi-final. Australia, also led by a foreign coach (German Holger Osieck), opened the tournament with a 4–0 win over India on their way to winning their group, before defeating Iraq in the quarter-final, and thrashing Uzbekistan 6–0 in the semi-final. For Australia, victory would bring its first ever title in an Asian tournament, having won three Oceania titles.  The match marked a record for Australia's goalkeeper Mark Schwarzer, becoming the country's most capped player with his 88th appearance. Shinji Kagawa missed the match due to injury.

Route to the final

Match details
Australia dominated the first half of the match, and had chances to score through their forwards Tim Cahill and Harry Kewell. Japan had a scare shortly after half-time when a cross from Luke Wilkshire was misjudged by Japan's goalkeeper Eiji Kawashima and hit the crossbar, only for Cahill's shot to be cleared off the goal-line. Japan, however, had chances on the counter-attack including a wasted opportunity for Shinji Okazaki halfway through the second half, missing a header on goal while he was unmarked. The deadlock remained unbroken until the 20th minute of extra time, when Japan substitute Tadanari Lee scored off a cross from Yuto Nagatomo. Japan held its lead until the end of extra time to win the final.

After the match, Keisuke Honda was named the "most valuable player" of the tournament. Both managers praised their players after the match; Osieck expressed disappointment that Australia could not convert numerous opportunities to score, while Zaccheroni called Japan's win a "great victory" and hailed Lee's impact as a substitute.

See also
 Australia–Japan football rivalry

References

External links
AFC Asian Cup 2011 Official Site

2011
Final
AFC
2011
 
 
January 2011 sports events in Asia
21st century in Doha
Australia–Japan sports relations